Until You Were Gone may refer to:

 Until You Were Gone (Chipmunk song), 2010
 Until You Were Gone (The Chainsmokers and Tritonal song), 2015